The San Juan Open is a defunct Grand Prix affiliated men's tennis tournament played from 1980 to 1981. It was held in San Juan, Puerto Rico and played on outdoor hard courts.

Finals

Singles

Doubles

Grand Prix tennis circuit
Hard court tennis tournaments
Tennis tournaments in Puerto Rico
Defunct tennis tournaments in Puerto Rico
Defunct sports competitions in Puerto Rico
1980 establishments in Puerto Rico
1981 disestablishments in Puerto Rico
Recurring sporting events established in 1980
Recurring sporting events disestablished in 1981